I soldi is a 1965 Italian anthology comedy film directed by Gianni Puccini.

Cast
Sylva Koscina as Leda
Tomas Milian	 as 	Bob
Enrico Maria Salerno
Alberto Lionello
Barbara Steele
Agnès Spaak
Andrea Checchi
Carlo Giuffrè
Maria Grazia Francia
Mario Pisu
Gianni Bonagura
Riccardo Garrone
Gianni Rizzo
Umberto D'Orsi
Paola Quattrini
Stefania Careddu
Rocco D'Assunta
Ignazio Leone 
Sandro Dori 
Enzo Maggio

External links
 

1965 films
1960s Italian-language films
Films directed by Gianni Puccini
Italian comedy films
1965 comedy films
1960s Italian films